This Moment is the fourteenth studio album by the Christian singer Steven Curtis Chapman. It was released on October 23, 2007, through Sparrow Records. "Cinderella" was released as a radio single and became popular in the United States, charting in the Top 10 on Christian Radio. Other radio singles were "Yours", which became a No. 1 single, and "Miracle of the Moment", which charted in the Top 10.

A Special Edition was released later, featuring acoustic versions of four of the songs from the album.

Track listing

Personnel

 Steven Curtis Chapman – vocals, acoustic piano, guitars 
 Patrick Warren – keyboards
 Brian Gocher – programming
 F. Reid Shippen – additional programming 
 Solomon Olds – additional programming (5)
 Jeremy Bose – programming (10)
 Robin Ghosh – additional programming (11)
 Paul Moak – guitars
 Eric Schermerhorn – electric guitars
 Lyle Workman – electric guitars
 Jerry McPherson – guitar (3, 7)
 Tony Lucido – bass (1, 9)
 Chris Chaney – bass (2, 3, 4, 7, 10, 11)
 James Gregory – bass (5, 6, 8)
 Ben Phillips – drums (1, 5, 8, 9, 11)
 Abraham Laboriel Jr. – drums (2, 3, 4, 7, 10)
 Will Franklin Chapman – drums (6)
 Eric Darken – percussion
 Scott Sheriff – backing vocals
 Caleb Chapman – vocal (6)

Strings (Tracks 1, 3, 4, 7, 8 & 11)
 Patrick Warren – arrangements and conductor 
 Shari Sutcliffe – contractor
 Joel Derouin – concertmaster 
 Daphne Chens, Larry Corbett, Joel Derouin, Andrew Duckles, Vanessa Freebarin-Smith, Tamara Hatwan, Leah Katz, Peter Kent, Natalie Leggett, Darrin McCann, Robin Olson, Alyssa Park, Sara Parkins, Katia Popov, Harry Shirinian, Daniel Smith, Christina Soule, Josephine Vergara, Ian Walker, Evan Wilson and John Wittenberg – string players

Choir (Tracks 4, 6, 9 & 11)
 Julia Anderson, Caleb Chapman, Emily Clanton, Courtney Gott, Meredith Hardin, Betsey Long, Wes Nelson, Will Nelson, Melissa Northup, Scott Sheriff and Robert Wise

Production 

 Matt Bronleewe – producer
 Steven Curtis Chapman – producer
 Brad O'Donnell – A&R
 F. Reid Shippen – mixing at Sound Stage Studios (Nashville, Tennessee)
 Buckley Miller – mix assistant
 Rusty Varenkamp – engineer, editing
 Valente Torrez – assistant engineer
 Andy Hunt – additional engineer
 Danny Northup – additional engineer
 Ben Phillips – additional engineer
 Aaron Swihart – additional engineer
 Ben Phillips – additional editing
 Conway Recording Studios (Los Angeles, California) – recording location
 Bletchley Park Studio (Nashville, Tennessee) – additional recording location
 Pentavarit (Nashville, Tennessee) – additional recording location
 The Smoakstack (Nashville, Tennessee) – additional recording location
 The Laundry Room (Nashville, Tennessee) – additional recording location
 Emack (Nashville, Tennessee) – additional recording location
 Jess Sutcliffe – strings recording engineer, at Capitol Studios (Los Angeles, California)
 Ted Jensen – mastering at Sterling Sound (New York City, New York)
 Dave Stuenebrink – production coordination for Showdown Productions
 Lani Crump – production coordination for Showdown Productions
 Mark Delong – photography
 Amber Lehman – wardrobe
 Megan Thompson – grooming
 Jan Cook – creative director
 Tim Frank – art direction, at Boerhaus
 Adam Moore – design, at Boerhaus

Special Edition Acoustic Tracks
 Ed Cash – additional production, recording, mixing
 Bob Boyd – mastering at Ambient Digital (Houston, Texas)

Critical reception
This Moment was well received by critics. Jared Johnson, of AllMusic, gave the album 3.5 out of 5 stars and wrote "You get the feeling that the man with the most Dove Awards in the history of the Gospel Music Association could write this stuff in his sleep. He's that good, and the tunes are that well done." John DiBiase, of Jesus Freak Hideout, gave the album 4 out of 5 stars calling it "a relevant and inspiring album that proves Steven Curtis Chapman still has plenty to offer the world of music twenty years after his debut."

Chart performance
This Moment peaked at No. 47 on Billboard'''s Digital Albums chart. The songs "Cinderella" and "Miracle of the Moment" both peaked at No. 4 on the Billboard Christian Songs chart.

Awards
In 2009, the song "Cinderella" was nominated for two Dove Awards - Song of the Year and Pop/Contemporary Recorded Song of the Year - at the 40th GMA Dove Awards.

This Moment: Cinderella Edition
On May 27, 2008, Sparrow Records released This Moment: Cinderella Edition''. This edition has four additional tracks, including the acoustic version of the single "Cinderella". This version gained notoriety for being released days after the death of Chapman's youngest daughter, Maria Sue, who was one of the inspirations behind the song. The studio claims that there were plans for this edition a month before the accident.

References

Steven Curtis Chapman albums
2007 albums